Samadhiala Charan is a village and former non-salutory princely state  on Saurashtra peninsula in Gujarat, India. At present, the village lies in Jetpur taluka of Rajkot district.

History 
The petty princely state, in Gohelwar prant, was ruled by Charan chieftains.

In 1901, it comprised a single village, with a population of 195, yielding 2,700 Rupees state revenue (1903-4, mostly from land), paying no tribute. It had an area of 5 sq. miles.

References

External links 

 Imperial Gazetteer, on DSAL.UChicago.edu - Kathiawar

Princely states of Gujarat
Charan
Charan princely states